"This Heart" may refer to:

 "This Heart" (Gene Redding song), a 1974 song by Gene Redding
 "This Heart" (Sweethearts of the Rodeo song), a 1990 song by Sweethearts of the Rodeo